Li Jie (born 6 March 1984 in Chengdu, Sichuan) is a Chinese-born Dutch women table tennis player who now represents the Netherlands.

She was born in Chengdu, and resides in Den Helder. She currently plays for Spanish team Club Cartagena.

Career highlights

Olympic Games
2008, Beijing, team competition, 9th
2012, London, team competition, 5th
2008, Beijing and 2012, London, women's singles, round of sixteen
World Championships
2015, Suzhou, women's doubles, semi-final
2008, Guangzhou, team competition, 7th
2014, Tokyo, team competition, 5th
2011, Rotterdam and 2015, Suzhou, women's singles, round of sixteen
European Championships
2008, St. Petersburg, team competition, winner 
2009, Stuttgart, team competition, winner 
2011, Gdansk-Sopot, team competition, winner 
European Games
2015, Baku, women's singles, runner-up 
2015, Baku, team competition, runner-up 
Pro Tour Meetings
2007, Velenje, women's doubles, semi final
2007, Stockholm, women's doubles, quarter final
2008, Velenje, women's doubles, winner 
2008, Santiago, women's singles, quarter final
2008, Santiago, women's doubles, semi final
2008, Yokohama, team competition, 5th
2008, Daejeon, women's doubles, semi final
2008, Shanghai, women's doubles, semi final
2008, Salzburg, women's singles, semi final
2010, Velenje, women's doubles, runner-up
2010, New Delhi, women's doubles, runner-up
2014, Almeria, women's doubles, semi final

References
 2008 Olympic profile
 ITTF Profile

Notes

External links
 

1984 births
Living people
Chinese emigrants to the Netherlands
Dutch female table tennis players
Olympic table tennis players of the Netherlands
Sportspeople from Chengdu
Table tennis players at the 2008 Summer Olympics
Table tennis players at the 2012 Summer Olympics
Table tennis players at the 2016 Summer Olympics
European Games silver medalists for the Netherlands
Table tennis players at the 2015 European Games
Table tennis players from Sichuan
Naturalised table tennis players
World Table Tennis Championships medalists
Naturalised citizens of the Netherlands
European Games medalists in table tennis
Table tennis players at the 2019 European Games